AQT may refer to:
 Nuiqsut Airport, Alaska, United States  
 Avioquintana, a Mexican airline  
 AQT, Automation Framework of Tech Mahindra Automation.
 Alpine Quantum Technologies https://www.aqt.eu/